Fort Davis may refer to the following.
Fort Davis National Historic Site
Fort Davis, Alaska
Fort Davis, Oklahoma 
Fort Davis, Panama 
Fort Davis, Texas 
Fort Davis (Washington, D.C.), a neighborhood of Washington, D.C.
Cantonment Davis, a temporary fort built at the former location of Fort Johnson Illinois 
Fort Davis, Ireland